Shakuntala Vashishta 
was the first woman in Indian Police who later become deputy superintendent in 1969.

Education
Vashishta held degrees of Master of Arts and bachelor of laws.

Career
Vashishta started her career as an inspector in Punjab Police. She served as police inspector for 17 years before becoming a deputy superintendent of police (DSP) in 1966. She became a DSP in Delhi Police in 1969. She retired in September 1984 from her last office as a deputy commissioner of police from 9th Battalion of Delhi Armed Forces.

References

Vashishta, Shakuntala